Dennis Dengering (born 6 March 1993) is a Dutch professional football player who last played as a right back for Fortuna Sittard in the Dutch Eerste Divisie.

Club career
He made his professional debut as Jong PSV player in the second division on 24 August 2013 against De Graafschap in a 3–0 away defeat. He entered the field as a half-time substitute for Burak Kardeş. After his contract had expired mid 2014, Dengering signed a one-year deal with Eerste Divisie side Fortuna Sittard.

He was released in summer 2016 and joined amateur side EHC Hoensbroek.

References

1993 births
Living people
People from Beek
Association football fullbacks
Dutch footballers
Netherlands youth international footballers
PSV Eindhoven players
Fortuna Sittard players
Eerste Divisie players
EHC Hoensbroek players
Jong PSV players
Footballers from Limburg (Netherlands)